Karl Arnold (1901–1958) was a German politician.

Karl Arnold may also refer to:

Karl Arnold (chemist) (1853–1929), German chemist and mountaineer
Karl Arnold (painter) (1883–1953), German painter
Karl Arnold (weightlifter) (1940–2012), German Olympic weightlifter

See also
Carl Arnold, American football coach
Carl Arnold (composer), German composer